The Corpus Museum is a human biology interactive museum, located in Oegstgeest, near Leiden, in the Netherlands.

Billed as "a journey through the human body", the museum provides both education and entertainment through a combination of permanent and variable collections.

Opened in 2008 by Queen Beatrix, the museum is the world's first museum of its type.

References

Museums in South Holland
Medical museums in the Netherlands